Rufus Napoleon Rhodes (June 5, 1856, Pascagoula, Mississippi – January 12, 1910, Birmingham, Alabama) was the founder and managing editor of the Birmingham News from 1888 until his death.

He served as a director and 2nd Vice-President of the Associated Press. He was a delegate to the Democratic National Conventions of 1892 and 1904, and a Brigadier General in the Alabama National Guard.

He is buried in Birmingham's Elmwood Cemetery.

1856 births
1910 deaths
19th-century American newspaper publishers (people)
American newspaper publishers (people)
Businesspeople from Birmingham, Alabama
People from Pascagoula, Mississippi
United States Army generals
Journalists from Alabama
Journalists from Mississippi
Burials at Elmwood Cemetery (Birmingham, Alabama)